Guy Ralph Kebble  (born 2 May 1966) is a former South African rugby union player.

Playing career
Kebble went to school at Bishops in Cape Town and represented  schools at the annual Craven Week tournament in 1983.

In 1994 he toured with the Springboks to New Zealand and played in two test matches. He also played in eight tour matches, scoring one try for the Springboks.

Test history

See also
List of South Africa national rugby union players – Springbok no. 599

References

1966 births
Living people
South African rugby union players
South Africa international rugby union players
Western Province (rugby union) players
Sharks (Currie Cup) players
Rugby union props
Alumni of Diocesan College, Cape Town
Stellenbosch University alumni
Rugby union players from Gauteng